Lubsza is a river in Lubusz Voivodeship, Poland. It is a tributary of Lusatian Neisse (Nysa Łużycka) near Gubin.

Rivers of Lubusz Voivodeship
Rivers of Poland